Samara is a city on the eastern bank of the Volga in Russia.

Samara may also refer to:

Geography
Samara Oblast, the federal subject of Russia surrounding the city
Samara Bend, the largest bend of the Volga, Russia
Samara Reservoir, an informal name of Kuybyshev Reservoir on the Volga
Samara (Volga), a river in Russia, a left tributary of the Volga
Samara (Dnieper), a river in Ukraine, a left tributary of the Dnieper
Samarskyi District, an urban district of the city of Dnipro, Ukraine
Sămara, a village in Poiana Lacului Commune, Argeș County, Romania
Samara, the old name of the Somme River, France
Samara, alternative name of Smara, a city in Western Sahara
Sámara, a beach town in Costa Rica
Neu Samara Colony, a former Mennonite colony in the Orenburg region, Russia

Biology
Samara (fruit), winged seeds found on maples, elms and other trees
Samara, a synonym of the plant genus Embelia

Given name
Samara (given name)

Other
Samara culture, an eneolithic (Copper Age) culture located in the Samara Bend region in modern-day Russia
Lada Samara, a model of Lada automobile named after the city
Samara flag, a 19th-century Bulgarian flag
Samara Flag Monument, a monument in Stara Zagora, Bulgaria
Samara (house), West Lafayette, Indiana, also known as  the John E. Christian House, a building designed by Frank Lloyd Wright
Samara (charitable organisation), a  non-partisan advocacy group for political and civic engagement in Canada
Samara (film) (ಸಮರ "war"), a Kannada-language Indian film released in 1995
Samara Morgan, the main antagonist of The Ring (2002 film)
Samara (Mass Effect), a character in the Mass Effect series
Samara (Mexico City), a mixed-use development in Mexico City

See also
 Samar (disambiguation)
 Samarra, an ancient city in Iraq
 Samaria (disambiguation)
 Samra (disambiguation)
 Smara
 Samsara